This is the complete list of Asian Games medalists in kurash since 2018.

Men

66 kg

81 kg

90 kg

+90 kg

Women

52 kg

63 kg

78 kg

References

External links 
Kurash Results Book

Kurash
medalists